Gourdine is a surname. Notable people with the surname include:

Anthony Gourdine, American singer, member of Little Anthony and the Imperials
Meredith Gourdine (1929–1998), American long jumper, engineer, and physicist